The 2011 F.C. New York season will be the club's third year of existence, as well as their inaugural season of playing professional soccer. New York will be playing in the USL Professional Division, the third-tier of American soccer.

It is expected that, in addition to USL Pro, the club will participate in the 2011 U.S. Open Cup for the first time, as well. However, U.S. Soccer has yet to make an announcement on team allocations for the Open Cup tournament.

Review

April 
F.C. New York played their first ever match on the evening of April 9, 2011, against Orlando City. FCNY's away match ended in disaster, losing 3–0 to the Lions.

May 
On May 23, FCNY's head coach, Matt Weston, resigned as head coach of the club. He was replaced by assistant, Paul Shaw. Shaw is to serve as interim head coach for the remainder of the 2011 season.

Club

Current roster
As of June 10, 2011.

Technical staff 
Coaching staff
{|class="wikitable"
|-
!Position
!Staff
|-
|Technical director|| Matt Weston
|-
|Assistant coach|| TBA
|-
|Academy director|| TBA
|-
|Camp Director|| Chris J. Symons
|- Management

USL Pro

National Division

Match results

U.S. Open Cup

References 

2011
American soccer clubs 2011 season
New York
2011 in sports in New York (state)